FTF – Confederation of Professionals in Denmark (Danish: FTF) was founded in 1952 and was one of the three national trade union centers, with about 80 Danish trade unions affiliated.

History
The FTF was founded in 1952.  At the time, the major Danish trade union centre was the Danish Confederation of Trade Unions (LO), which was affiliated to the Social Democratic Party.  Many clerical unions objected to this affiliation, and founded the FTF as an unaffiliated rival.  Over time, fierce rivalry with the LO turned to co-operation, and the federation also worked with the Danish Confederation of Professional Associations (AC).  By 2009, the FTF had a membership of 450,000.

From 2015, FTF engaged in negotiations with LO about a potential merger.  This occurred on 1 January 2019, and the LO became part of the new Danish Trade Union Confederation (FH).  However, the federation's largest affiliate, the Finance Federation, along with the Danish Physiotherapists, and the Association of Designers, voted against joining FH, and instead became independent.

The FTF was affiliated with the International Trade Union Confederation (ITUC), the European Trade Union Confederation (ETUC), the Trade Union Advisory Committee to the OECD (TUAC) and the Council of Nordic Trade Unions (NFS).

Membership
Members of the 86 trade unions of the FTF were typically employees with a higher education and an academic degree (e.g. a bachelor's degree or a master's degree) or a first professional degree. Some members didn't have a higher education but a vocational education ("white-collar workers"). A typical FTF-member occupies a middle or upper middle position in society as regards salary and pension benefits. Many FTF-members were leaders.

FTF-members were e.g. pharmaconomists, journalists, medical laboratory scientists, teachers, bank employees, physical therapists, businesspersons, actors, dental hygienists, police officers, podiatrists, engineers, nurses, stage directors, social workers, radiographers etc.

Affiliates

Presidents
1970: Jens Christensen
1977: Kirsten Stallknecht
1984: Martin Rømer
1988: Anker Christoffersen
2003: Bente Sorgenfrey

External links
FTF's Official Website (in Danish)
FTF's Official Website (in English)

References

 
International Trade Union Confederation
European Trade Union Confederation
Trade Union Advisory Committee to the OECD
Council of Nordic Trade Unions
Trade unions established in 1952
Trade unions disestablished in 2018